Nizhny Tyukun (Tübänge Tökön) is a rural locality (a village) in Kamyshlinsky Selsoviet, Karmaskalinsky District, Bashkortostan, Russia. The population was 297 as of 2010. There are 4 streets.

Geography 
Nizhny Tyukun is located 27 km southeast of Karmaskaly (the district's administrative centre) by road. Verkhny Tyukun is the nearest rural locality.

References 

Rural localities in Karmaskalinsky District